Tadgell is a surname of Old English origin. Notable people with the surname include:

Lady Juliet Tadgell (born 1935), British heiress, race horse breeder, and landowner
Robert Tadgell, Australian Supreme Court justice

References